Kenneth Tigar (born September 24, 1942) is an American actor, primarily on American television, and translator.

Life
Kenneth Leslie Tigar was born into a Jewish family in Chelsea, Massachusetts, and raised in the Greater Boston Area.

He received his BA and Ph.D. in German literature from Harvard University. As an undergraduate, he was active in theater as both an actor and a director. He spent a year at the University of Göttingen and performed in Vienna and other European cities.

Career

He has appeared in numerous television shows, including starring as the short-tempered Captain Jensen in L.A. Heat from 1997 to 1999, appearing in a total of 47 episodes. He guest-starred in two episodes of Cheers, playing different characters – "The Boys in the Bar" in Season 1 as a gay character called Fred, and later in Season 4's "Don Juan Is Hell", as a professor of Diane's.

Tigar's film roles include playing a bomb squad leader in Lethal Weapon 2 (1989) and Lethal Weapon 3 (1992), and in The Avengers (2012), in which he has a brief but pivotal part as a German resister to Loki.

Filmography

Television works (selected)

References

External links
 

1942 births
20th-century American male actors
20th-century American translators
21st-century American male actors
American male film actors
American male television actors
German–English translators
Harvard University alumni
Living people
Male actors from Massachusetts
People from Chelsea, Massachusetts